Frederick David Ely (September 24, 1838 – August 6, 1921) was a United States representative from Massachusetts.

Biography
Frederick D. Ely was born in Wrentham, Massachusetts on September 24, 1838.

He attended Day’s Academy and graduated from Brown University in 1859.  He studied law, was admitted to the bar and commenced practice at Dedham.  He was a trial justice, was elected a member of the Massachusetts House of Representatives, and served in the Massachusetts State Senate.  He was also a member of the Dedham school committee.

Ely was elected as a Republican to the Forty-ninth Congress (March 4, 1885 – March 3, 1887).  He was an unsuccessful candidate for reelection in 1886 to the Fiftieth Congress and resumed the practice of law, and did serve as justice of the Municipal Court of Boston from 1888 to 1914.

He married Eliza Baldwin Whittier on December 6, 1866. She died on February 12, 1881, and he remarried to Anna Emerson on August 10, 1885.

He died at his home in Dedham on August 6, 1921, and was buried in Old Village Cemetery.

See also
 1873 Massachusetts legislature
 1878 Massachusetts legislature

References

Politicians from Dedham, Massachusetts
Republican Party members of the Massachusetts House of Representatives
Republican Party Massachusetts state senators
Brown University alumni
1838 births
1921 deaths
Republican Party members of the United States House of Representatives from Massachusetts
Lawyers from Dedham, Massachusetts
Burials at Old Village Cemetery
19th-century American lawyers